Datu Lipus Makapandong National High School is a secondary school located at D.O. Plaza Avenue, Poblacion, Rosario, Agusan del Sur. It was first located at the municipal gymnasium of Rosario since its foundation on 2002 as a community high school. It was converted into a National High School through R.A. 9868 from a Community High School last 2009. It was first headed by Santiago M. Eliseo and was succeeded by Voit D. Quicos last 2009.

The name Datu Lipus Makapandong was given to the school in honor of the late Agusan del Sur governor Democrito Plaza Sr because it was his tribal name. Every December, DLMNHS celebrates its founding anniversary.

The school garnered many awards, from academic to other extra curricular activities participated by its students. The school joined annual competitions of different schools like science fair, school press conference, math fair, speech festivals, inter-high basketball competitions, drum and lyre competitions, cheerdancing, sports competitions, etc.

DLMNHS is still on ongoing construction of new buildings.

References

2002 establishments in the Philippines
Schools in Agusan del Sur
Educational institutions established in 2002
High schools in the Philippines